Big Tree is a children's novel written and illustrated by Mary and Conrad Buff. In the book a personified 5,000-year-old giant sequoia tells its life story. The novel was first published in 1946 and was a Newbery Honor recipient in 1947. It may have been inspired by the Wawona Tree.

See also 

 1946 in literature

References 

1946 American novels
American children's novels
Newbery Honor-winning works
Sequoiadendron
Viking Press books
1946 children's books
Plants in children literature